Gellibrand is a town in south west Victoria, Australia. At the 2016 census, Gellibrand had a population of 210. Gellibrand is home to the Otway Districts Demons Football and Netball Club, who play Australian Rules Football and participate in the Colac & District Football League.

Gellibrand was named after Joseph Gellibrand, the first attorney-general of Van Diemen's Land (Tasmania) and an early European settler in Victoria.

Gellibrand is positioned close to the Gellibrand River, with tourist attractions including fishing, access to the Old Beechy Rail Trail for cycling, walking, and horse-riding, and proximity to many of the Otway Ranges' walks and waterfalls. The Great Victorian Bike Ride had an overnight stay in Gellibrand in 2004 when a record 8,100 riders took part.

References

Towns in Victoria (Australia)